Brouwersgracht is a RandstadRail stop in The Hague, Netherlands.

History 
The station for line 2, 3, 4, 25 and 51 is on the Prinsegracht, at the junction with the Brouwersgracht. Tram 6 has a tram stop on Brouwersgracht.

RandstadRail services 
The following services currently call at Brouwersgracht:

Tram Services 
Please note Tram 6 does not depart from the same stop as Lines 2, 3, 4, 25 and 51.

Bus services 
 25 (Grote Markt - Vrederust)
 51 (Grote Markt - Rijswijk - Delft railway station)

Gallery 

RandstadRail stations in The Hague